This is a complete list of seasons competed by the BC Lions, a Canadian Football League team. While the team was founded in 1954, they did not join the CFL until it was founded in 1958. Throughout their history, the Lions have won six Grey Cups.

{| class="wikitable"
|-
!Leagueseason
!Lionsseason
!League
!Division
!Finish
!Wins
!Losses
!Ties
!Playoffs
|-
!align="center"|1954
!align="center"|1954
|align="center"|WIFU
|align="center"|–
|align="center"|5th
|align="center"|1
|align="center"|15
|align="center"|0
|
|-
!align="center"|1955
!align="center"|1955
|align="center"|WIFU
|align="center"|–
|align="center"|4th
|align="center"|5
|align="center"|11
|align="center"|0
|
|-
!align="center"|1956
!align="center"|1956
|align="center"|WIFU
|align="center"|–
|align="center"|4th
|align="center"|6
|align="center"|10
|align="center"|0
|
|-
!align="center"|1957
!align="center"|1957
|align="center"|WIFU
|align="center"|–
|align="center"|4th
|align="center"|4
|align="center"|11
|align="center"|1
|
|-
!align="center"|1958
!align="center"|1958
|align="center"|CFL
|align="center"|W.I.F.U.
|align="center"|5th
|align="center"|3
|align="center"|13
|align="center"|0
|
|-
!align="center"|1959
!align="center"|1959
|align="center"|CFL
|align="center"|W.I.F.U.
|align="center"|3rd
|align="center"|9
|align="center"|7
|align="center"|0
|Lost West Semi-Finals (Eskimos) 61–15
|-
!align="center"|1960
!align="center"|1960
|align="center"|CFL
|align="center"|W.I.F.U.
|align="center"|4th
|align="center"|5
|align="center"|9
|align="center"|2
|
|-
!align="center"|1961
!align="center"|1961
|align="center"|CFL
|align="center"|West
|align="center"|5th
|align="center"|1
|align="center"|13
|align="center"|2
|
|-
!align="center"|1962
!align="center"|1962
|align="center"|CFL
|align="center"|West
|align="center"|4th
|align="center"|7
|align="center"|9
|align="center"|0
|
|-
!align="center"|1963
!align="center"|1963
|align="center"|CFL
|align="center" bgcolor="#ffeeaa"|West*
|align="center" bgcolor="#ffbbbb"|1st^
|align="center"|12
|align="center"|4
|align="center"|0
|style="background: #ffeeaa;"|Won West Finals (Roughriders) 2–1 seriesLost Grey Cup (Tiger-Cats) 21–10
|-
!align="center"|1964
!align="center"|1964
|align="center" bgcolor="#ccffcc"|CFL†
|align="center" bgcolor="#ffeeaa"|West*
|align="center" bgcolor="#ffbbbb"|1st^
|align="center"|11
|align="center"|2
|align="center"|3
|style="background: #ccffcc;"|Won West Finals (Stampeders) 2–1 seriesWon Grey Cup (Tiger-Cats) 34–24 †
|-
!align="center"|1965
!align="center"|1965
|align="center"|CFL
|align="center"|West
|align="center"|4th
|align="center"|6
|align="center"|9
|align="center"|1
|
|-
!align="center"|1966
!align="center"|1966
|align="center"|CFL
|align="center"|West
|align="center"|5th
|align="center"|5
|align="center"|11
|align="center"|0
|
|-
!align="center"|1967
!align="center"|1967
|align="center"|CFL
|align="center"|West
|align="center"|5th
|align="center"|3
|align="center"|12
|align="center"|1
|
|-
!align="center"|1968
!align="center"|1968
|align="center"|CFL
|align="center"|West
|align="center"|4th
|align="center"|4
|align="center"|11
|align="center"|1
|
|-
!align="center"|1969
!align="center"|1969
|align="center"|CFL
|align="center"|West
|align="center"|3rd
|align="center"|5
|align="center"|11
|align="center"|0
|Lost West Semi-Final (Stampeders) 35–21
|-
!align="center"|1970
!align="center"|1970
|align="center"|CFL
|align="center"|West
|align="center"|4th
|align="center"|6
|align="center"|10
|align="center"|0
|
|-
!align="center"|1971
!align="center"|1971
|align="center"|CFL
|align="center"|West
|align="center"|4th
|align="center"|6
|align="center"|9
|align="center"|1
|
|-
!align="center"|1972
!align="center"|1972
|align="center"|CFL
|align="center"|West
|align="center"|5th
|align="center"|5
|align="center"|11
|align="center"|0
|
|-
!align="center"|1973
!align="center"|1973
|align="center"|CFL
|align="center"|West
|align="center"|3rd
|align="center"|5
|align="center"|9
|align="center"|2
|Lost West Semi-Final (Roughriders) 33–13
|-
!align="center"|1974
!align="center"|1974
|align="center"|CFL
|align="center"|West
|align="center"|3rd
|align="center"|8
|align="center"|8
|align="center"|0
|Lost West Semi-Final (Roughriders) 24–14
|-
!align="center"|1975
!align="center"|1975
|align="center"|CFL
|align="center"|West
|align="center"|5th
|align="center"|6
|align="center"|10
|align="center"|0
|
|-
!align="center"|1976
!align="center"|1976
|align="center"|CFL
|align="center"|West
|align="center"|4th
|align="center"|5
|align="center"|9
|align="center"|2
|
|-
!align="center"|1977
!align="center"|1977
|align="center"|CFL
|align="center"|West
|align="center"|2nd
|align="center"|10
|align="center"|6
|align="center"|0
|Won West Semi-Final (Blue Bombers) 33–32Lost West Final (Eskimos) 38–1
|-
!align="center"|1978
!align="center"|1978
|align="center"|CFL
|align="center"|West
|align="center"|4th
|align="center"|7
|align="center"|7
|align="center"|2
|
|-
!align="center"|1979
!align="center"|1979
|align="center"|CFL
|align="center"|West
|align="center"|3rd
|align="center"|9
|align="center"|6
|align="center"|1
|Lost West Semi-Final (Stampeders) 37–2
|-
!align="center"|1980
!align="center"|1980
|align="center"|CFL
|align="center"|West
|align="center"|4th
|align="center"|8
|align="center"|7
|align="center"|1
|
|-
!align="center"|1981
!align="center"|1981
|align="center"|CFL
|align="center"|West
|align="center"|3rd
|align="center"|10
|align="center"|6
|align="center"|0
|Won West Semi-Final (Blue Bombers) 15–11Lost West Final (Eskimos) 22–16
|-
!align="center"|1982
!align="center"|1982
|align="center"|CFL
|align="center"|West
|align="center"|4th
|align="center"|9
|align="center"|7
|align="center"|0
|
|-
!align="center"|1983
!align="center"|1983
|align="center"|CFL
|align="center" bgcolor="#ffeeaa"|West*
|align="center" bgcolor="#ffbbbb"|1st^
|align="center"|11
|align="center"|5
|align="center"|0
|style="background: #ffeeaa;"|Won West Final (Blue Bombers) 39–21Lost Grey Cup (Argonauts) 18–17
|-
!align="center"|1984
!align="center"|1984
|align="center"|CFL
|align="center"|West
|align="center" bgcolor="#ffbbbb"|1st^
|align="center"|12
|align="center"|3
|align="center"|1
|Lost West Final (Blue Bombers) 3–14
|-
!align="center"|1985
!align="center"|1985
|align="center" bgcolor="#ccffcc"|CFL†
|align="center" bgcolor="#ffeeaa"|West*
|align="center" bgcolor="#ffbbbb"|1st^
|align="center"|13
|align="center"|3
|align="center"|0
|style="background: #ccffcc;"|Won West Final (Blue Bombers) 42–22Won Grey Cup (Tiger-Cats) 37–24†
|-
!align="center"|1986
!align="center"|1986
|align="center"|CFL
|align="center"|West
|align="center"|2nd
|align="center"|12
|align="center"|6
|align="center"|0
|Won West Semi-Final (Blue Bombers) 21–14Lost West Final (Eskimos) 41–5
|-
!align="center"|1987
!align="center"|1987
|align="center"|CFL
|align="center"|West
|align="center" bgcolor="#ffbbbb"|1st^
|align="center"|12
|align="center"|6
|align="center"|0
|Lost West Final (Eskimos) 31–7
|-
!align="center"|1988
!align="center"|1988
|align="center"|CFL
|align="center" bgcolor="#ffeeaa"|West*
|align="center"|3rd
|align="center"|10
|align="center"|8
|align="center"|0
|style="background: #ffeeaa;"|Won West Semi-Final (Roughriders) 42–18Won West Final (Eskimos) 37–19Lost Grey Cup (Blue Bombers) 22–21
|-
!align="center"|1989
!align="center"|1989
|align="center"|CFL
|align="center"|West
|align="center"|4th
|align="center"|7
|align="center"|11
|align="center"|0
|
|-
!align="center"|1990
!align="center"|1990
|align="center"|CFL
|align="center"|West
|align="center"|4th
|align="center"|6
|align="center"|11
|align="center"|1
|
|-
!align="center"|1991
!align="center"|1991
|align="center"|CFL
|align="center"|West
|align="center"|3rd
|align="center"|11
|align="center"|7
|align="center"|0
|Lost West Semi-Final (Stampeders) 43–41
|-
!align="center"|1992
!align="center"|1992
|align="center"|CFL
|align="center"|West
|align="center"|4th
|align="center"|3
|align="center"|15
|align="center"|0
|
|-
!align="center"|1993
!align="center"|1993
|align="center"|CFL
|align="center"|West
|align="center"|4th
|align="center"|10
|align="center"|8
|align="center"|0
|Lost West Semi-Final (Stampeders) 17–9
|-
!align="center"|1994
!align="center"|1994
|align="center" bgcolor="#ccffcc"|CFL†
|align="center" bgcolor="#ffeeaa"|West*
|align="center"|3rd
|align="center"|11
|align="center"|6
|align="center"|1
|style="background: #ccffcc;"|Won West Semi-Final (Eskimos) 24–23Won West Final (Stampeders) 37–36Won Grey Cup (Baltimore CFLers) 26–23 †
|-
!align="center"|1995
!align="center"|1995
|align="center"|CFL
|align="center"|North
|align="center"|3rd
|align="center"|10
|align="center"|8
|align="center"|0
|Lost North Semi-Final (Eskimos) 26–15
|-
!align="center"|1996
!align="center"|1996
|align="center"|CFL
|align="center"|West
|align="center"|5th
|align="center"|5
|align="center"|13
|align="center"|0
|
|-
!align="center"|1997
!align="center"|1997
|align="center"|CFL
|align="center"|West
|align="center"|4th
|align="center"|8
|align="center"|10
|align="center"|0
|Lost East Semi-Final (Alouettes) 45–35
|-
!align="center"|1998
!align="center"|1998
|align="center"|CFL
|align="center"|West
|align="center"|3rd
|align="center"|9
|align="center"|9
|align="center"|0
|Lost West Semi-Final (Eskimos) 40–33
|-
!align="center"|1999
!align="center"|1999
|align="center"|CFL
|align="center"|West
|align="center" bgcolor="#ffbbbb"|1st^
|align="center"|13
|align="center"|5
|align="center"|0
|Lost West Final (Stampeders) 26–24
|-
!align="center"|2000
!align="center"|2000
|align="center" bgcolor="#ccffcc"|CFL†
|align="center" bgcolor="#ffeeaa"|West*
|align="center"|3rd
|align="center"|8
|align="center"|10
|align="center"|0
|style="background: #ccffcc;"|Won West Semi-Final (Eskimos) 34–32Won West Final (Stampeders) 37–23Won Grey Cup (Alouettes) 28–26 †
|-
!align="center"|2001
!align="center"|2001
|align="center"|CFL
|align="center"|West
|align="center"|3rd
|align="center"|8
|align="center"|10
|align="center"|0
|Lost West Semi-Final (Stampeders) 28–19
|-
!align="center"|2002
!align="center"|2002
|align="center"|CFL
|align="center"|West
|align="center"|3rd
|align="center"|10
|align="center"|8
|align="center"|0
|Lost West Semi-Final (Blue Bombers) 30–3
|-
!align="center"|2003
!align="center"|2003
|align="center"|CFL
|align="center"|West
|align="center"|4th
|align="center"|11
|align="center"|7
|align="center"|0
|Lost East Semi-Final (Argonauts) 28–7
|-
!align="center"|2004
!align="center"|2004
|align="center"|CFL
|align="center" bgcolor="#ffeeaa"|West*
|align="center" bgcolor="#ffbbbb"|1st^
|align="center"|13
|align="center"|5
|align="center"|0
|style="background: #ffeeaa;"|Won West Final (Roughriders) 27–25Lost Grey Cup (Argonauts) 27–19
|-
!align="center"|2005
!align="center"|2005
|align="center"|CFL
|align="center"|West
|align="center" bgcolor="#ffbbbb"|1st^
|align="center"|12
|align="center"|6
|align="center"|0
|Lost West Final (Eskimos) 28–23
|-
!align="center"|2006
!align="center"|2006
|align="center" bgcolor="#ccffcc"|CFL†
|align="center" bgcolor="#ffeeaa"|West*
|align="center" bgcolor="#ffbbbb"|1st^
|align="center"|13
|align="center"|5
|align="center"|0
|style="background: #ccffcc;"|Won West Final (Roughriders) 45–18Won Grey Cup (Alouettes) 25–14 †
|-
!align="center"|2007
!align="center"|2007
|align="center"|CFL
|align="center"|West
|align="center" bgcolor="#ffbbbb"|1st^
|align="center"|14
|align="center"|3
|align="center"|1
|Lost West Final (Roughriders) 26–17
|-
!align="center"|2008
!align="center"|2008
|align="center"|CFL
|align="center"|West
|align="center"|3rd
|align="center"|11
|align="center"|7
|align="center"|0
|Won West Semi-Final (Roughriders) 33–12Lost West Final (Stampeders) 22–18
|-
!align="center"|2009
!align="center"|2009
|align="center"|CFL
|align="center"|West
|align="center"|4th
|align="center"|8
|align="center"|10
|align="center"|0
|Won East Semi-Final (Tiger-Cats) 34–27Lost East Final (Alouettes) 56–18
|-
!align="center"|2010
!align="center"|2010
|align="center"|CFL
|align="center"|West
|align="center"|3rd
|align="center"|8
|align="center"|10
|align="center"|0
|Lost West Semi-Final (Roughriders) 41–38
|-
!align="center"|2011
!align="center"|2011
|align="center" bgcolor="#ccffcc"|CFL†
|align="center" bgcolor="#ffeeaa"|West*
|align="center" bgcolor="#ffbbbb"|1st^
|align="center"|11
|align="center"|7
|align="center"|0
|style="background: #ddffdd"|Won West Final (Eskimos) 40–23Won Grey Cup (Blue Bombers) 34–23†
|-
!align="center"|2012
!align="center"|2012
|align="center"|CFL
|align="center"|West
|align="center" bgcolor="#ffbbbb"|1st^
|align="center"|13
|align="center"|5
|align="center"|0
|Lost West Final (Stampeders) 34–29
|-
!align="center"|2013
!align="center"|2013
|align="center"|CFL
|align="center"|West
|align="center"|3rd
|align="center"|11
|align="center"|7
|align="center"|0
|Lost West Semi-Final (Roughriders) 29–25
|-
!align="center"|2014
!align="center"|2014
|align="center"|CFL
|align="center"|West
|align="center"|4th
|align="center"|9
|align="center"|9
|align="center"|0
|Lost East Semi-Final (Alouettes) 50–17
|-
!align="center"|2015
!align="center"|2015
|align="center"|CFL
|align="center"|West
|align="center"|3rd
|align="center"|7
|align="center"|11
|align="center"|0
|Lost West Semi-Final (Stampeders) 35–9
|-
!align="center"|2016
!align="center"|2016
|align="center"|CFL
|align="center"|West
|align="center"|2nd
|align="center"|12
|align="center"|6
|align="center"|0
|Won West Semi-Final (Blue Bombers) 32–31Lost West Final (Stampeders) 42–15
|-
!align="center"|2017
!align="center"|2017
|align="center"|CFL
|align="center"|West
|align="center"|5th
|align="center"|7
|align="center"|11
|align="center"|0
|
|-
!align="center"|2018
!align="center"|2018
|align="center"|CFL
|align="center"|West
|align="center"|4th
|align="center"|9
|align="center"|9
|align="center"|0
|Lost East Semi-Final (Tiger-Cats) 48–8
|-
!align="center"|2019
!align="center"|2019
|align="center"|CFL
|align="center"|West
|align="center"|5th
|align="center"|5
|align="center"|13
|align="center"|0
|-
!align="center"|2020
!align="center"|2020
|align="center"|CFL
|align="center"|West
!align="center" colSpan="5"|Season cancelled due to COVID 19 pandemic
|-
!align="center"|2021
!align="center"|2021
|align="center"|CFL
|align="center"|West
|align="center"|4th
|align="center"|5
|align="center"|9
|align="center"|0
|
|-
!align="center"|2022
!align="center"|2022
|align="center"|CFL
|align="center"|West
|align="center"|2nd
|align="center"|12
|align="center"|6
|align="center"|0
|Won West Semi-Final (Stampeders) 30–16Lost West Final (Blue Bombers) 28–20
|-
!align="center" colSpan="5"|Regular season Totals (1954–2022)
|align="center"|561
|align="center"|571
|align="center"|24
|
|-
!align="center" colSpan="5"|Playoff Totals (1954–2022)
|align="center"|22
|align="center"|33
|align="center"|0
|
|-
!align="center" colSpan="5"|Grey Cup Totals (1954–2022)
|align="center"|6
|align="center"|4
|align="center"|0
|
|-

 
Seasons